Louis Chirillo is an American-Canadian former actor. He is of Colombian descent. He is famous for voicing Keefe in Zoids: Fuzors. He has also voiced Shaman in Pucca and Dukey on the first through the fourth seasons of Johnny Test.

In 2008 he founded Chirillo Productions, a voice-over company that provides English-dubbed content for Brazilian markets. The company was originally based in Salvador, Bahia, Brazil, but has since relocated to Bellevue, Washington. He apparently has owned the trademark to the Seattle Totems since 2018.

Filmography

Film
 Finder's Fee (2001) - Male Cop
 Love and Other Dilemmas (2006) - Izzy
 Battle in Seattle (2007) - Individual
 Watchmen (2009) - Face To Face TV Producer

Animation
 Sitting Ducks (2001-2003, TV Series) – Ed (voice)
 Sabrina: Friends Forever (2002, TV Series) - Salem Saberhagen
 Being Ian (2005-2007, TV Series) – Ken Kelley / Red Nose / Commercial Announcer / Mr. Lipsett / Community Vol #1 / Dodgy Fellow / Bodyguard / Mate #2 / Fan #5 / Bully / Man's Voice / Woodsman / Rutherford / TV Announcer #1 / Commander / Man in Hazmut Suit / Kyle's Dimwitted Girlfriend
 Johnny Test (2005-2011, TV Series) – Dukey / Brain Freezer / Mr. Henry Teacherman (Season 1–4)
 Pucca (2006-2008, TV Series) – Shaman
 Storm Hawks (2007, TV Series) – Rex Guardian Member #1
 GeoTrax (2007, TV Series) – Paul
 Clanners - Captain Memo
 Tom and Jerry Tales (2008, TV Series) – Lion
 Iron Man: Armored Adventures (2009, TV Series) – Living Laser
 Barbie: The Pearl Princess (2014) – Wormwood

Anime
 Mobile Suit Gundam: Char's Counterattack (1988)
 Zoids: Fuzors (2003, TV Series) – Keefe
 Black Lagoon (2006, TV Series) – Chin
 Transformers: Cybertron (2005, TV Series) – Ransack
 .hack//Roots (2006, TV Series) – Kuhn
 Death Note (2006) – Hitoshi Demegawa
 The Story of Saiunkoku (2006, TV Series) – Reishin Hong
 Powerpuff Girls Z (2006-2007, TV Series) – Professor Utonium
 L: Change the World (2008) - Pedestrian

Video games
 Devil Kings (2005) – Orwik
 Dynasty Warriors: Gundam (2007) – Heero Yuy
 Dynasty Warriors: Gundam 2 (2008) – Heero Yuy
 Prototype (2009)

References

External links
 
 

Living people
American expatriate male actors in Canada
American expatriates in Brazil
American male film actors
American male television actors
American male voice actors
American people of Colombian descent
Canadian male film actors
Canadian male television actors
Canadian male voice actors
Year of birth missing (living people)